Port Elizabeth railway station is a railway station, located in Port Elizabeth, South Africa.

In 1873, Prime Minister John Molteno of the Cape Colony commenced work on connecting Port Elizabeth to the developing national railway network, resulting in the station complex being located in the historic central district, near the harbour. The prosperity which followed the construction of railways to the interior earned for the port the designation of "the Liverpool of South Africa."

Passenger services operating from the station include:
Metrorail - operates frequent commuter trains to Uitenhage and the surrounding suburbs during weekdays, with a reduced service over weekends
Shosholoza Meyl - operates daily inter-city trains to Johannesburg and Bloemfontein. You can also get to Cape Town, Kimberley, Pietermaritzburg and Durban (by changing trains in Bloemfontein), to East London (by changing trains in Noupoort, Colesberg or Bloemfontein), to Mthatha (by changing trains in Noupoort and Amabele) or to Grahamstown (by changing trains in Alicedale)
Premier Classe - operates twice-weekly luxury trains to Cape Town via George and Oudtshoorn.

The Apple Express narrow-gauge tourist train to Avontuur operates from the separate station in Humewood Road near King's Beach. It departs regularly for Thornhill Village via a rail bridge over the Van Stadens River, the highest narrow-gauge rail bridge in the world.

See also
 Donkin Heritage Trail

References

Railway
Transport in Port Elizabeth
Metrorail (South Africa) stations
Shosholoza Meyl stations